The Jefferson Formation is a geologic formation in Montana. It preserves fossils dating back to the Devonian period.

See also

 List of fossiliferous stratigraphic units in Montana
 Paleontology in Montana

References
 

Devonian Montana
Devonian Idaho
Devonian southern paleotropical deposits